Stolpe is a municipality in the Vorpommern-Greifswald district, in Mecklenburg-Vorpommern, Germany. Nearby are the ruins of Stolpe Abbey.

References

Vorpommern-Greifswald